Busia is a county in the former Western Province of Kenya. It borders Kakamega County to the east, Bungoma County to the north, Lake Victoria and Siaya County to the south and Busia District, Uganda to the west. The county has about 893,000 people and spans about 1,700 square kilometers making it one of the smallest counties in Kenya. Busia is inhabited by the Luhya tribe of Kenya and the Teso of Kenya, and small groups of the 
Luo.  The Luhya communities include the Abakhayo, Marachi, Samia and Abanyala communities.

Etymology
Busia county is part of the western province of Kenya. It has been commonly inhabited by the Luhya tribe of Kenya the minority tribe of Iteso. Prior to being a county, it was known as Busia district before more districts were created by president Mwai Kibaki. Busia county borders Uganda to the west. The Samia people of Busia are the same community as those of Uganda Busia district. There has been an outcry for Samia people on why the colonial government decided to cut and separate them placing them in different countries.

Geography 
Busia County borders Bungoma County to the north, Kakamega County to the east, Siaya County and Lake Victoria to the south east and south respectively. Busia with approximate of 1700 square kilometers is bordered to the south by Lake Victoria with some rivers pouring water into it. the rivers include River Nzoia in Budalangi and River Sio in Samia. There are several hills in Nambuku, Odiado Hills and Funyula. Several swamps are also located across the county with species such as crocodiles, hippos, and multiple types of fish. There are also some leopards and antelopes that are usually spotted across the county.

Climate 
The county climatic conditions are greatly affected by Lake Victoria which borders it to the south western part. We have short and long rains. The main type of rainfall experienced in the county is convectional rainfall. Busia often experiences hot and wet climate.

Lakes and rivers 
Lake Victoria
River Sio
River Malaba
River Nzoia 
River Akanyo

Religion 
Most residents are Christian with few Muslims and African believers.

Language 
The Kenya national languages are English and Swahili, in Busia county Swahili is commonly used but most residents speak their native mother tongue that is either Luhya or Iteso languages.

Economy 
The main economic activities include farming and tourism.

Tourism 
 Lake Victoria
 Kakapel Monument
 Samia Hills
 Kavirondo Rocks
 Yala Swamp
 Malaba Sanctuary
 River Nzoia
 Sio Siteki Swamp

Demographics 
Busia county has a total population of 893,681 persons. Of this 426,252 are female, 467,401 are male, and 28 people were reported as intersex. The county has a population density of 527 persons with an average household size of 4.5 persons.

Source 

Though most residents of Busia County are ethnically Luhya, there is also a substantial population of Luo and Iteso residents.

Law and government

Administrative units 

Busia County is made up of seven administrative sub-counties, thirty-five county ward assemblies, sixty locations and one hundred and eighty-one sub-locations.

Sub-Counties

Nambale Constituency
Butula Constituency
Funyula Constituency
Budalangi Constituency
Matayos Constituency
Teso North Constituency
Teso South Constituency

County government 
Sospeter Ojaamong has been governor since being first elected in 2013 and he will finish his second term in 2022 and thus not eligible to run for the seat. He was deputised by Kizito Osore Wangalwa in his first term and now he is deputised by Moses Okhoba Mulomi. Amos Wako Sitswila has been Busia senator since 2013 after being elected as the first senator. Florence Mwikali Mutua is the current women representative after taking office in 2013. The legislation in the county is done by the county assembly, it plays the oversight role of the executive, It comprises 53 members (35 elected representing 35 wards of Busia county and 18 nominated members mostly women). It is chaired by the speaker who is elected by the assembly currently Bernard Wamalwa.

Executive 
County governor, deputy county governor and Busia county departments headed by county executive committee members and chief officers.

Legislature 
Busia county assembly comprises 35 elected MCA and nominated MCA the assembly is chaired by county assembly speaker, currently Bernard Wamalwa.

Judiciary 
The judiciary of Busia is exercised by Kenyan judiciary. There is Busia law court located in the town of Busia.

Health 
Busia County has a total of 81 health facilities, out of this 1 county referral hospital, 6 sub-county hospitals, 12 health centres, 49 dispensaries, 10 Medical Clinics, 6 Nursing Homes and 1 in the other categories.

Common diseases in the county include Malaria, Respiratory Diseases, and diarrhoea.

Education 
Busia county has a total of 735 pre-primary schools, 551 primary schools, 152 secondary schools. As at 2014 the county had an enrolment 255,008 students in primary schools and 41,332 students in secondary schools.

Alupe University College is the only public university in Busia County.

Transport and infrastructure 
The county has 470 km of earth roads, 740 km of murram roads and 312 km of bitumen roads. A total of seven postal offices are spread across the county with 3,200 letter boxes installed, 2,284 letter boxes rented and 916 letter boxes vacant.

Services and urbanisation 
 Source: USAid Kenya

Villages and settlements

See also
Lake Victoria

References

 
Counties of Kenya
2013 establishments in Kenya